The 2008 IIHF World U18 Championship Division I was an international under-18 ice hockey competition organised by the International Ice Hockey Federation. Both Division I tournaments made up the second level of the 2008 IIHF World U18 Championships. The Group A tournament was played in Toruń, Poland, and the Group B tournament was played in Riga, Latvia, both from 2 to 8 April 2008. The Czech Republic and Norway won the Group A and B tournaments respectively and gained promotion to the Top Division of the 2009 IIHF World U18 Championships.

Group A
The Group A tournament was played in Toruń, Poland from 2 to 8 April 2008.

Final Standings

Results

All times local

Group B
The Group B tournament was played in Riga, Latvia from 2 to 8 April 2008.

Final Standings

Results

All times local

References

2008 IIHF World U18 Championships
International ice hockey competitions hosted by Latvia
International ice hockey competitions hosted by Poland
IIHF World U18 Championship Division I
World
Latvian